Jacques Domergue (born 25 March 1953) is a French politician.  He was a member of the National Assembly of France for the Hérault department from 2002 to 2012, for the 2nd constituency from 2002 to 2007, and the 1st constituency from 2007 to 2012.  He is also a municipal counciller in Montpellier and has served on the regional council for Languedoc-Roussillon. He is a member of the Union for a Popular Movement (UMP).

References

External links
Page at the National Assembly website
Official blog

1953 births
Living people
People from Perpignan
Union for a Popular Movement politicians
Deputies of the 12th National Assembly of the French Fifth Republic
Deputies of the 13th National Assembly of the French Fifth Republic